Hedge Lawn is a historic home located at Colonie in Albany County, New York.  It was built in 1870 and is an unusual -story mansion designed in a composite  style with Greek Revival  and Second Empire style elements.  It features a Mansard roof with scalloped slate shingles, three pedimented dormers, and a monumental portico across the front elevation supported by six massive Doric order columns.  Also on the property are a contributing carriage house, lawns, mature plantings, iron fence, and two wagon sheds.

It was listed on the National Register of Historic Places in 1985.

References

Houses on the National Register of Historic Places in New York (state)
Greek Revival houses in New York (state)
Second Empire architecture in New York (state)
Houses completed in 1870
Houses in Albany County, New York
National Register of Historic Places in Albany County, New York